The 2022–23 Indiana Pacers season is the 56th season for the franchise in the National Basketball Association (NBA).

Draft 

The Pacers owned their first-round pick. They also had two second-round picks.

Roster

Standings

Division

Conference

Game log

Preseason 

|-style="background:#cfc;"
| 1
| October 5
| @ Charlotte
| 
| Aaron Nesmith (16)
| Jalen Smith (10)
| Haliburton,  McConnell (6)
| Spectrum Center9,382
| 1–0
|- style="background:#fcc;"
| 2
| October 7
| @ New York
| 
| Tyrese Haliburton (20)
| Myles Turner (9)
| Tyrese Haliburton (7)
| Madison Square Garden16,510
| 1–1
|- style="background:#cfc;"
| 3
| October 12
| New York
| 
| Bennedict Mathurin (27)
| Oshae Brissett (8)
| Andrew Nembhard (9)
| Gainbridge Fieldhouse7,081
| 2–1
|-style="background:#fcc;
| 4
| October 14
| Houston
| 
| Buddy Hield (19)
| Smith, Mathurin (5)
| Andrew Nembhard (7)
| Gainbridge Fieldhouse7,107
| 2–2

Regular season

|- style="background:#fcc;"
| 1
| October 19
| Washington
| 
| Tyrese Haliburton (26)
| Buddy Hield (10)
| Tyrese Haliburton (7)
| Gainbridge Fieldhouse15,027
| 0–1
|- style="background:#fcc;"
| 2
| October 21
| San Antonio
| 
| Tyrese Haliburton (27)
| Terry Taylor (7)
| Tyrese Haliburton (12)
| Gainbridge Fieldhouse12,073
| 0–2
|-style="background:#cfc;"
| 3
| October 22
| Detroit
| 
| Bennedict Mathurin (27)
| Smith, Bitadze (15)
| Tyrese Haliburton (10)
| Gainbridge Fieldhouse16,056
| 1–2
|-style="background:#fcc;"
| 4
| October 24
| @ Philadelphia
| 
| Tyrese Haliburton (19)
| Jalen Smith (10)
| Tyrese Haliburton (10)
| Wells Fargo Center19,786
| 1–3
|- style="background:#fcc;"
| 5
| October 26
| @ Chicago
| 
| Buddy Hield (25)
| Jalen Smith (9)
| Tyrese Haliburton (11)
| United Center18,306
| 1–4
|- style="background:#cfc;"
| 6
| October 28
| @ Washington
| 
| Myles Turner (27)
| Myles Turner (10)
| Tyrese Haliburton (12)
| Capital One Arena13,463
| 2–4
|- style="background:#cfc;"
| 7
| October 29
| @ Brooklyn
| 
| Bennedict Mathurin (32)
| Jalen Smith (14)
| Haliburton, Hield (8)
| Barclays Center17,732
| 3–4
|-style="background:#fcc;"
| 8
| October 31
| @ Brooklyn
| 
| Chris Duarte (30)
| Tyrese Haliburton (8)
| Buddy Hield (7)
| Barclays Center15,770
| 3–5

|-style="background:#cfc;"
| 9
| November 4
| Miami
| 
| Buddy Hield (25)
| Haliburton, Hield (9)
| Tyrese Haliburton (9)
| Gainbridge Fieldhouse13,141
| 4–5
|- style="background:#cfc;"
| 10
| November 7
| New Orleans
| 
| Myles Turner (37)
| Myles Turner (12)
| Tyrese Haliburton (13)
| Gainbridge Fieldhouse14,052
| 5–5
|- style="background:#fcc;"
| 11
| November 9
| Denver
| 
| Bennedict Mathurin (30)
| Myles Turner (11)
| Tyrese Haliburton (12)
| Gainbridge Fieldhouse14,069
| 5–6
|-style="background:#cfc;"
| 12
| November 12
| Toronto
| 
| Buddy Hield (22)
| Myles Turner (10)
| Tyrese Haliburton (15)
| Gainbridge Fieldhouse13,089
| 6–6
|-style="background:#cfc;"
| 13
| November 16
| @ Charlotte
| 
| Tyrese Haliburton (22)
| Myles Turner (10)
| Tyrese Haliburton (11)
| Spectrum Center14,756
| 7–6
|-style="background:#cfc;"
| 14
| November 18
| @ Houston
| 
| Tyrese Haliburton (19)
| Jalen Smith (18)
| Tyrese Haliburton (8)
| Toyota Center15,882
| 8–6
|- style="background:#cfc;"
| 15
| November 19
| Orlando
| 
| Tyrese Haliburton (22)
| Myles Turner (11)
| Tyrese Haliburton (14)
| Gainbridge Fieldhouse14,478
| 9–6
|- style="background:#cfc;"
| 16
| November 21
| Orlando
| 
| Bennedict Mathurin (22)
| Jackson, Nesmith (8)
| Tyrese Haliburton (14)
| Gainbridge Fieldhouse14,478
| 10–6
|-style="background:#fcc;"
| 17
| November 23
| Minnesota
| 
| Myles Turner (31)
| Myles Turner (7)
| Tyrese Haliburton (14)
| Gainbridge Fieldhouse15,751
| 10–7
|- style="background:#cfc;"
| 18
| November 25
| Brooklyn
| 
| Buddy Hield (26)
| Myles Turner (8)
| Tyrese Haliburton (15)
| Gainbridge Fieldhouse15,404
| 11–7
|-style="background:#fcc"
| 19
| November 27
| @ L.A. Clippers
| 
| Jalen Smith (23)
| Jalen Smith (9)
| Tyrese Haliburton (11)
| Crypto.com Arena16,805
| 11–8
|-style="background:#cfc"
| 20
| November 28
| @ L.A. Lakers
| 
| Tyrese Haliburton (24)
| Myles Turner (13)
| Tyrese Haliburton (14)
| Crypto.com Arena16,034
| 12–8
|-style="background:#fcc"
| 21
| November 30
| @ Sacramento
| 
| Mathurin, Smith (22)
| Jackson, Smith, Turner (6)
| Haliburton, McConnell (10)
| Golden 1 Center17,611
| 12–9

|-style="background:#fcc"
| 22
| December 2
| @ Utah
| 
| Myles Turner (18)
| Tyrese Haliburton (6)
| Andrew Nembhard (10)
| Vivint Arena18,206
| 12–10
|-style="background:#fcc;"
| 23
| December 4
| @ Portland
| 
| Myles Turner (24)
| Buddy Hield (11)
| Andrew Nembhard (8)
| Moda Center17,579
| 12–11
|-style="background:#cfc;"
| 24
| December 5
| @ Golden State
| 
| Andrew Nembhard (31)
| Hield, Smith (9)
| Andrew Nembhard (13)
| Chase Center18,064
| 13–11
|-style="background:#fcc;"
| 25
| December 7
| @ Minnesota
| 
| Haliburton, Hield (28)
| Myles Turner (7)
| Tyrese Haliburton (15)
| Target Center15,472
| 13–12
|-style="background:#cfc;"
| 26
| December 9
| Washington
| 
| Buddy Hield (28)
| Brissett, Mathurin (8)
| Tyrese Haliburton (11)
| Gainbridge Fieldhouse15,039
| 14–12
|-style="background:#fcc;"
| 27
| December 10
| Brooklyn
| 
| Tyrese Haliburton (35)
| Bennedict Mathurin (7)
| Tyrese Haliburton (9)
| Gainbridge Fieldhouse14,280
| 14–13
|-style="background:#fcc;"
| 28
| December 12
| Miami
| 
| Buddy Hield (19)
| Myles Turner (13)
| Tyrese Haliburton (6)
| Gainbridge Fieldhouse15,309
| 14–14
|-style="background:#cfc;"
| 29
| December 14
| Golden State
| 
| Tyrese Haliburton (29)
| Mathurin, Smith (6)
| T. J. McConnell (9)
| Gainbridge Fieldhouse15,069
| 15–14
|-style="background:#fcc;"
| 30
| December 16
| @ Cleveland
| 
| Bennedict Mathurin (22)
| Myles Turner (11)
| Tyrese Haliburton (14)
| Rocket Mortgage FieldHouse19,432
| 15–15
|-style="background:#fcc;"
| 31
| December 18
| New York
| 
| Hield, Nesmith (23)
| Aaron Nesmith (10)
| Tyrese Haliburton (10)
| Gainbridge Fieldhouse14,513
| 15–16
|-style="background:#cfc;"
| 32
| December 21
| @ Boston
| 
| Tyrese Haliburton (33)
| Jalen Smith (9)
| Tyrese Haliburton (8)
| TD Garden19,156
| 16–16
|-style="background:#cfc;"
| 33
| December 23
| @ Miami
| 
| Tyrese Haliburton (43)
| Smith, Turner (11)
| Tyrese Haliburton (7)
| FTX Arena19,600
| 17–16
|-style="background:#fcc;"
| 34
| December 26
| @ New Orleans 
| 
| Bennedict Mathurin (15)
| Myles Turner (8)
| Haliburton, McConnell (6)
| Smoothie King Center18,636
| 17–17
|-style="background:#cfc;"
| 35
| December 27
| Atlanta
| 
| Buddy Hield (28)
| Buddy Hield (9)
| Tyrese Haliburton (7)
| Gainbridge Fieldhouse17,028
| 18–17
|-style="background:#cfc;"
| 36
| December 29
| Cleveland
| 
| Tyrese Haliburton (29)
| Myles Turner (12)
| Tyrese Haliburton (9)
| Gainbridge Fieldhouse17,274
| 19–17
|-style=background:#cfc;"
| 37
| December 31
| L.A. Clippers
| 
| Myles Turner (34)
| Buddy Hield (8)
| Tyrese Haliburton (10)
| Gainbridge Fieldhouse16,731
| 20–17

|-style=background:#cfc;"
| 38
| January 2
| Toronto
| 
| Bennedict Mathurin (21)
| Jalen Smith (11)
| Tyrese Haliburton (8)
| Gainbridge Fieldhouse14,054
| 21–17
|-style=background:#fcc;"
| 39
| January 4
| @ Philadelphia
| 
| Buddy Hield (24)
| Buddy Hield (9)
| Tyrese Haliburton (12)
| Wells Fargo Center20,033
| 21–18
|-style="background:#cfc;"
| 40
| January 6
| Portland
| 
| Bennedict Mathurin (19)
| Nesmith, Turner (7)
| Tyrese Haliburton (12)
| Gainbridge Fieldhouse16,548
| 22–18
|-style="background:#cfc;"
| 41
| January 8
| Charlotte
| 
| Myles Turner (29)
| Oshae Brissett (10)
| Tyrese Haliburton (13)
| Gainbridge Fieldhouse15,805
| 23–18
|-style="background:#fcc;"
| 42
| January 11
| @ New York
| 
| Buddy Hield (31)
| Hield, McConnell (8)
| Haliburton, McConnell (7)
| Madison Square Garden18,249
| 23–19
|-style="background:#fcc;"
| 43
| January 13
| Atlanta
| 
| Bennedict Mathurin (26)
| Brissett, Jackson (10)
| T. J. McConnell (7)
| Gainbridge Fieldhouse16,071
| 23–20
|-style="background:#fcc;"
| 44
| January 14
| Memphis
| 
| Chris Duarte (25)
| T. J. McConnell (8)
| T. J. McConnell (11)
| Gainbridge Fieldhouse17,274
| 23–21
|-style="background:#fcc;"
| 45
| January 16
| @ Milwaukee
| 
| Myles Turner (30)
| Mathurin, Turner (8)
| McConnell, Nembhard (9)
| Fiserv Forum17,412
| 23–22
|-style="background:#fcc;"
| 46
| January 18
| @ Oklahoma City
| 
| Andrew Nembhard (18)
| Trevelin Queen (9)
| Andrew Nembhard (7)
| Paycom Center14,478
| 23–23
|-style="background:#fcc;"
| 47
| January 20
| @ Denver
| 
| Bennedict Mathurin (19)
| Myles Turner (7)
| McConnell, Nembhard (6)
| Ball Arena19,609
| 23–24
|-style="background:#fcc;"
| 48
| January 21
| @ Phoenix
| 
| Bennedict Mathurin (23)
| Myles Turner (12)
| T. J. McConnell (12)
| Footprint Center17,071
| 23–25
|-style="background:#cfc;"
| 49
| January 24
| Chicago
| 
| Mathurin, Turner (26)
| Chris Duarte (9)
| T. J. McConnell (10)
| Gainbridge Fieldhouse16,102
| 24–25
|-style="background:#fcc;"
| 50
| January 25
| @ Orlando
| 
| Bennedict Mathurin (26)
| Myles Turner (13)
| T. J. McConnell (8)
| Amway Center18,846
| 24–26
|-style="background:#fcc;"
| 51
| January 27
| Milwaukee
| 
| Myles Turner (24)
| Bennedict Mathurin (8)
| T. J. McConnell (9)
| Gainbridge Fieldhouse16,090
| 24–27
|-style="background:#fcc;"
| 52
| January 29
| @ Memphis
| 
| Bennedict Mathurin (27)
| Bennedict Mathurin (8)
| T. J. McConnell (7)
| FedExForum17,794
| 24–28

|-style="background:#fcc;"
| 53
| February 2
| L.A. Lakers
| 
| Tyrese Haliburton (26)
| Myles Turner (13)
| Tyrese Haliburton (12)
| Gainbridge Fieldhouse17,274
| 24–29
|-style="background:#cfc;"
| 54
| February 3
| Sacramento
| 
| Buddy Hield (21)
| Myles Turner (13)
| Tyrese Haliburton (9)
| Gainbridge Fieldhouse17,274
| 25–29
|-style="background:#fcc;"
| 55
| February 5
| Cleveland
| 
| Myles Turner (27)
| Myles Turner (10)
| Tyrese Haliburton (11)
| Gainbridge Fieldhouse17,274
| 25–30
|-style="background:#fcc;"
| 56
| February 8
| @ Miami
| 
| Buddy Hield (29)
| Myles Turner (10)
| Tyrese Haliburton (10)
| Miami-Dade Arena19,600
| 25–31
|-style="background:#fcc;"
| 57
| February 10
| Phoenix
| 
| Bennedict Mathurin (22)
| Chris Duarte (6)
| Andrew Nembhard (10)
| Gainbridge Fieldhouse16,522
| 25–32
|-style="background:#fcc;"
| 58
| February 11
| @ Washington
| 
| Tyrese Haliburton (21)
| Tyrese Haliburton (6)
| Tyrese Haliburton (7)
| Capital One Arena18,387
| 25–33
|-style="background:#fcc;"
| 59
| February 13
| Utah
| 
| Tyrese Haliburton (30)
| Aaron Nesmith (6)
| Tyrese Haliburton (12)
| Gainbridge Fieldhouse15,004
| 25–34
|-style="background:#cfc;"
| 60
| February 15
| Chicago
| 
| Buddy Hield (27)
| Myles Turner (9)
| Tyrese Haliburton (8)
| Gainbridge Fieldhouse15,599
| 26–34
|-style="background:#fcc;"
| 61
| February 23
| Boston
| 
| Myles Turner (40)
| Myles Turner (10)
| Tyrese Haliburton (14)
| Gainbridge Fieldhouse16,125
| 26–35
|-style="background:#cfc;"
| 62
| February 25
| @ Orlando
| 
| Myles Turner (24)
| Nwora, Turner (8)
| Tyrese Haliburton (14)
| Amway Center19,231
| 27–35
|-style="background:#cfc;"
| 63
| February 28
| @ Dallas
| 
| Tyrese Haliburton (32)
| Jalen Smith (9)
| Tyrese Haliburton (6)
| American Airlines Center20,277
| 28–35

|-style="background:#fcc;"
| 64
| March 2
| @ San Antonio
| 
| Buddy Hield (27)
| Chris Duarte (9)
| T. J. McConnell (5)
| AT&T Center14,617
| 28–36
|-style="background:#cfc;"
| 65
| March 5
| @ Chicago
| 
| Tyrese Haliburton (29)
| Isaiah Jackson (7)
| Tyrese Haliburton (11)
| United Center21,225
| 29–36
|-style="background:#fcc;"
| 66
| March 6
| Philadelphia
| 
| Tyrese Haliburton (40)
| Buddy Hield (8)
| Tyrese Haliburton (16)
| Gainbridge Fieldhouse15,008
| 29–37
|-style="background:#cfc;"
| 67
| March 9
| Houston
| 
| Tyrese Haliburton (29)
| Aaron Nesmith (7)
| Tyrese Haliburton (19)
| Gainbridge Fieldhouse16,027
| 30–37
|-style="background:#cfc;"
| 68
| March 11
| @ Detroit
| 
| Jalen Smith (20)
| Isaiah Jackson (11)
| Andrew Nembhard (8)
| Little Caesars Arena20,190
| 31–37
|-style="background:#fcc;"
| 69
| March 13
| @ Detroit
| 
| Jordan Nwora (20)
| Hield, Smith (8)
| Andrew Nembhard (7)
| Little Caesars Arena18,313
| 31–38
|-style="background:#cfc;"
| 70
| March 16
| @ Milwaukee
| 
| Andrew Nembhard (24)
| Nwora, Smith, Turner (8)
| T. J. McConnell (12)
| Fiserv Forum17,797
| 32–38
|-style=background:#fcc;"
| 71
| March 18
| Philadelphia
| 
| Aaron Nesmith (25)
| Jordan Nwora (9)
| T.J. McConnell (9)
| Gainbridge Fieldhouse17,274
| 32–39
|-style=background:
| 72
| March 20
| @ Charlotte
| 
| 
| 
| 
| Spectrum Center
| 
|-style=background:
| 73
| March 22
| @ Toronto
| 
| 
| 
| 
| Scotiabank Arena
|

Transactions

Trades

Free agency

Re-signed

References 

Indiana Pacers seasons
Indiana Pacers
Indiana Pacers
Indiana Pacers